Tazehabad-e Amin (also Romanized as Tāzehābād-e Amīn; also known as Majīd Khān, Tāzehābād-e Majīdkhānī, and Tāzehābād-e Moḩammad-e Amīn) is a village in Saral Rural District, Saral District, Divandarreh County, Kurdistan Province, Iran. At the 2006 census, its population was 255, in 50 families. The village is populated by Kurds.

References 

Towns and villages in Divandarreh County
Kurdish settlements in Kurdistan Province